Jordy Vleugels (born 17 May 1996) is a Belgian footballer who plays as a midfielder for Magni Grenivík.

Club career
On 4 April 2018, Kairat announced that Vleugels had signed for their second team Kairat-A.

After a half year in Cyprus, it was confirmed on 8 November 2019, that Vleugels would join Australian club, Magpies Crusaders, from 2020.

Club statistics

References

External links

1996 births
Living people
People from Mol, Belgium
Footballers from Antwerp Province
Association football midfielders
Belgian footballers
Belgium youth international footballers
Willem II (football club) players
FC Dordrecht players
FC Kairat players
P.O. Xylotymbou players
Eredivisie players
Eerste Divisie players
2. deild karla players
Belgian expatriate footballers
Expatriate footballers in the Netherlands
Belgian expatriate sportspeople in the Netherlands
Expatriate footballers in Kazakhstan
Belgian expatriate sportspeople in Kazakhstan
Expatriate footballers in Cyprus
Belgian expatriate sportspeople in Cyprus
Expatriate soccer players in Australia
Belgian expatriate sportspeople in Australia
Expatriate footballers in Iceland
Belgian expatriate sportspeople in Iceland